Themista of Lampsacus, the wife of Leonteus, was a student of Epicurus, early in the 3rd century BC. Epicurus' school was unusual in the 3rd century, in that it allowed women to attend, and we also hear of Leontion attending Epicurus' school around the same time. Cicero ridicules Epicurus for writing "countless volumes in praise of Themista," instead of more worthy men such as Miltiades, Themistocles or Epaminondas. Themista and Leonteus named their son Epicurus.

Notes

References
Diogenes Laertius, 10. 5, 25, 26
Lactantius, Divine Institutes, 3. 25. 15
Clement of Alexandria, Stromata, 4. 121. 4
Cicero, In Pisonem, 26. 63; De Finibus, 2. 21. 68
http://ldysinger.stjohnsem.edu/@texts/0215_hippolytus/x-hippolytusBW.jpg

Hellenistic-era philosophers
Ancient Greek women philosophers
Epicurean philosophers
People from Lampsacus
3rd-century BC Greek people
3rd-century BC philosophers
Year of birth unknown
3rd-century BC deaths
3rd-century BC Greek women